Velika Lašna (in older sources also Velika Lašina) is a small village in the hills south of the Tuhinj Valley in the Upper Carniola region of Slovenia.

References

External links

Velika Lašna on Geopedia

Populated places in the Municipality of Kamnik